Ali D. Jasiqi (born 1937 in Junik, Kingdom of Yugoslavia) is a Kosovan-Albanian writer.

Education
He attended schools in Junik and Deçan, Gjakovë, finishing in Pristina. He graduated from the Philological Faculty in Albanian Language and Literature at the University of Pristina.

Current
He continues to write for both printed and electronic media in Kosovo, Albania, Macedonia and elsewhere. He lives in Pristina with his wife Hasbije Jasiqi, son and daughter-in-law.

Annotations

External links
Shenje ne lis available in the National Library of Australia collection
Ali D. Jasiqi: Poezi Medimetesh Të Thella
Ali D. Jasiqi Biography

Kosovo Albanians
Kosovan writers
1937 births
Living people
People from Junik